Joseph Meyer (March 12, 1894 – June 22, 1987) was an American songwriter, who wrote some of the most notable songs of the first half of the twentieth century. Many of his songs were originally written for Broadway musicals.

Meyer collaborated with many famous songwriters of the day including Buddy DeSylva, Al Lewis and Al Sherman. Three of his most famous songs were the 1922 hit, "California, Here I Come", "My Honey's Lovin' Arms" (1922) and "If You Knew Susie" (1925), a song he co-wrote with Buddy DeSylva. Meyer songs have been featured in over 120 motion picture soundtracks.

He wrote the melody to "A Cup of Coffee, a Sandwich, and You", lyrics by Al Dubin and Billy Rose, often used in Warner Brothers' cartoons during scenes of hunger, cooking and eating.

Wayne Newton recorded his song "Summer Colors" in 1967 where it reached #20 on the U.S. adult contemporary chart.

Meyer died in New York in June 1987, at the age of 93, following a long illness.

Broadway musicals
Battling Buttler (1923)
Big Boy (1925)
Gay Paree (1925)
Charlot Revue (1925)
Sweetheart Time (1926)
Just Fancy (1927)
Here's Howe (1928)
Lady Fingers (1929)
Jonica (1930)
Luana (1930)
Sweet and Low  (1930)
Shoot the Works (1931)
Ziegfeld Follies of 1934 (1934)
New Faces of 1936 (1936)
Shuffle Along (1952, revival)
Perfectly Frank (1980)
Five Guys Named Moe (1993)

References

External links
 
Joseph Meyer at IBDB
 Joseph Meyer recordings at the Discography of American Historical Recordings.

1894 births
1987 deaths
People from Modesto, California
American musical theatre composers
Jewish American songwriters
Songwriters from California
20th-century American musicians
20th-century American Jews